Eric Jamane Stokes (born March 1, 1999) is an American football cornerback for the Green Bay Packers of the National Football League (NFL). He played college football at Georgia and was drafted by the Packers in the first round of the 2021 NFL Draft.

Early years
Stokes attended Eastside High School in Covington, Georgia, where he played football and ran track. He committed to play college football at the University of Georgia in 2017.

College career
After redshirting his first year at Georgia in 2017, Stokes played in 13 of 14 games with three starts in 2018 and finished the season with 20 tackles. As a sophomore in 2019, he started 13 of 14 games, recording 38 tackles and one sack. He returned as a starter in 2020 where he recorded his first career interception, which he returned for a touchdown, in the opening game of the season. He finished the season with four interceptions and two touchdowns.

Professional career

Stokes was selected by the Green Bay Packers in the first round (29th overall) of the 2021 NFL Draft. He signed his four-year rookie contract on June 2, 2021, worth $11.93 million, including a $6.03 million signing bonus. 

Stokes was named the third outside cornerback on the depth chart to start the season. Following continued struggles and injuries by starter Kevin King through the first two weeks of the season, Stokes was named the starter opposite cornerback Jaire Alexander ahead of the Packers' Week 3 game against the San Francisco 49ers. The following week, he recorded his first NFL interception off a pass from Ben Roethlisberger during a 27–17 victory over the Pittsburgh Steelers. Starting from Week 5, and with exception of the Packers' Week 9 game against the Kansas City Chiefs, Stokes started every game for the Packers.

Stokes entered the 2022 season as the starting cornerback for the Packers. His play declined as the Packers defense struggled in his sophomore season. During a Week 9 loss to the Detroit Lions, he exited the game with an ankle injury. Head coach Matt LaFleur later informed the press that Stokes would miss the rest of the season with his injury.

NFL career statistics

Regular season

Postseason

References

External links
Green Bay Packers bio
Georgia Bulldogs bio

1999 births
Living people
People from Covington, Georgia
Players of American football from Georgia (U.S. state)
Sportspeople from the Atlanta metropolitan area
American football cornerbacks
Georgia Bulldogs football players
Green Bay Packers players